Robert Joseph McAlea (13 September 1920 – 21 February 2009), known as Bert McAlea, was a Northern Irish professional footballer who played as an inside forward.

Career
Born in Belfast, McAlea joined Bradford City from Ballymoney United in May 1948. He made four league appearances for the club. He was released by the club in September 1949.

Sources

References

1920 births
2009 deaths
Association footballers from Northern Ireland
Ballymoney United F.C. players
Bradford City A.F.C. players
English Football League players
Association football inside forwards